Stitch London (previously Stitch and Bitch London) is a knitting group in London, England, who meet weekly in various venues across central London to knit in public. It is also a virtual knitting group whose members join via newsletter, Facebook, Ravelry, and Twitter. Its members number in their thousands and it has a global membership despite being based in London.

The group is open to anyone who wants join. There are no restriction on who can join, and attendance is free.

Meetings happen all over London once a week. There is no set day. The group meets on weekday evenings, and venues vary from pubs and bars to cafes, and occasionally off-beat venues such as Bloomsbury Bowling Lanes, The Science Museum and The Hunterian Museum at London's Royal College of Surgeons.

They also send out a fortnightly newsletter, which include details of meeting venues, group news, knitting news, and the most bizarre and amusing knitting gems they can dig up on the web.

The group will also teach people to knit for free. Prospective knitters need to bring yarn and needles. The group has taught thousands of knitters to date.

Stitch London also organises charity knits, graffiti yarnstorming events, and workshops. They have worked with many of London's museums, most notably the Natural History Museum, the Science Museum and the Hunterian Museum.

History
The group was founded in January 2005  in a south London pub. Founders Lauren O’Farrell, Laura Parkinson and Georgia Reid decided to enter the world of public knitting. The group was inspired by the Stitch 'n Bitch book by Debbie Stoller.

In February 2007, Stitch and Bitch London presented the London Lion Scarf, a 550 ft scarf knitted by over 150 knitters from 15 different countries, around the necks of the Trafalgar Square Lions in central London. They raised over £2,500 for cancer research. 
In March 2007, the team expanded to five: Lauren 'Deadly Knitshade' O’Farrell, Laura 'Purl Princess' Parkinson, Joelle 'Knitting Ninja' Finck, Laura 'Lady Knitsalot' deLaat and Candice 'Go Go Garter Girl' Lamb.

In April 2007, the group won the UK's Largest Knitting Group prize, presented by the British Handknitting Association.

Stitchettes since 2007 have been Laura Davis, Joelle Finck, Laura deLaat, Candice Lamb, Annisa Chand and Jenny Steere. Several ex-Stitchettes have gone on to pursue other creative interests, notably Laura Parkinson as 'Purl About Town' for GMC Publications' Knitting magazine.

In November 2009, Lauren O'Farrell took on Stitch London as a full-time business.

The role of Stitch Sages was introduced in late 2009 which offered members the chance to become knitting teachers and pass on their skills on a voluntary basis.

The group has raised thousands of pounds for charities including Cancer Research UK, Age Concern, Macmillan Cancer Support, Médecins Sans Frontières and Breast Cancer Care.

Keeping up with social media an online forum on social networking site Ravelry, a page on Facebook and account on Twitter are all active.

Stitch and Bitch London became Stitch London in April 2010.

Books

In September 2011, Stitch London: 20 Kooky Ways to Knit the City and More by Lauren O'Farrell was published By David & Charles in the UK and US.

References

External links 
 
 Stitch London blog
 Stitch London Twitter
 Stitch London Facebook

Organizations established in 2005
Clubs and societies in London
Knitting organizations